Nycticeius is a small genus of bats in the vesper bat family, Vespertilionidae, and the only member of the tribe Nycticeiini. It contains three species, the evening bat (N. humeralis), the Cuban evening bat (N. cubanus) and Nycticeius aenobarbus. Some authorities include several other Old World species in Nycticeius, but recent genetic work shows that is a completely New World genus. Nycticeius is of Greek and Latin origin, meaning "belonging to the night".

The Cuban evening bat is found only on the island of Cuba, and very little is known about this species. It is similar in appearance to N. humeralis, but is considerably smaller (4–7 grams).

Species
 Nycticeius aenobarbus (Temminck, 1840) – Temminck's mysterious bat
 Nycticeius cubanus (Gundlach, 1861) – Cuban evening bat
 Nycticeius humeralis (Rafinesque, 1818) – evening bat

References

External links

 
Bat genera
Taxa named by Constantine Samuel Rafinesque